6W or 6-W may refer to:

Units of measurement
6°W, or 6th meridian west, a longitude coordinate
6 watts
6 weeks
6 wins, abbreviated in a Win–loss record (pitching)

Other
6W, IATA code for Saravia
Dublin 6W, see List of Dublin postal districts
06W, a designation for Typhoon Ora (1972)
6W, the production code for the 1985 Doctor Who serial The Two Doctors
6w (locomotive), a type of locomotive under the Whyte notation

See also
W6 (disambiguation)